Helladius of Ptolemais was a Christian bishop of Ptolemais (now Acre, Israel). He was present at the First Council of Ephesus (431).

References
Catholic Encyclopedia, s.v. Ptolemais

5th-century Syrian bishops
Year of birth missing
Year of death missing
People from Acre, Israel